Black Cloud is a 2004 American drama film which was directed and written by Rick Schroder and starred Eddie Spears, Russel Means, Julia Jones, Schroder and Tim McGraw, in his film acting debut.

Plot
Black Cloud, a young Navajo man, must take a journey of personal growth to prepare himself for a chance at boxing in the Olympics.

When Eddie returns to town with the rodeo and wants to rekindle his relationship with Black Cloud's girlfriend Sammi. Black Cloud confronts him and runs into trouble with Sheriff Cliff Powers after beating up Eddie who is Sammi's ex boyfriend and the father of her child, as well as Cliff's nephew.

After seeing Black Cloud in a boxing match an Olympic Scout named Norm Olsen offers him a try out for the team of the U.S. Olympics. Black Cloud rejects the offer initially believing that it would be unjust to "fight for the White Man". In trying to apply for Indian housing he and Sammi find out that his great grandfather was from Germany; believing he is cursed by his diluted bloodline, Black Cloud has a falling out with Sammi.

He goes to see his grandfather who takes him into the canyons and tells him about his family and the German man who helped his great grandmother after she was raped by several white men, and went by the name White Wolf. Realizing that his bloodline is pure, he decides to come back to Sammi and proposes to her.

He gets back into training for the tournament of the Golden Gloves which is coming up, and decides to take up the scout's offer if he wins. The day before the tournament, his best friend is seriously injured in a fight with Eddie and a set of other cowboys which Cliff refuses to arrest.

On the day of the tournament, Black Cloud goes through it to the finals where he meets Rocket Ray Tracy, the number one ranked light heavyweight fighter who is hoping to go pro after the tournament.

Cast
 Eddie Spears as Black Cloud
 Russel Means as Bud
 Julia Jones as Sammi
 Rick Schroder as Eddie
 Tim McGraw as Sheriff Cliff Powers
 Marion "Pooch" Hall as Rocket Ray Tracey
 Peter Greene as Norm Olsen
 Wayne Knight as Mr. Tipping
 Nathaniel Arcand as Jimmy
 Branscombe Richmond as Peter
 Alimi Ballard as Dusty

Release
The film was not picked up for wide release but premiered at the Phoenix Film Festival in April 2004, and was seen at several small festivals including the April 2005 Haskell Indian Nations Film Festival in Kansas; it marked Schroder's directing debut.

Accolades 
The film won the "Best Director Award" at the San Diego Film Festival in October 2004.

References

External links
 

2004 films
2004 drama films
American drama films
American independent films
Films about Native Americans
Navajo-language films
Films scored by Chad Fischer
Films about Olympic boxing
2004 directorial debut films
2004 independent films
2000s English-language films
2000s American films